The Men's United States Squash Open 2014 is the men's edition of the 2014 United States Open (squash), which is a PSA World Series event Gold (Prize money: $115,000). The event took place at the Daskalakis Athletic Center in Philadelphia, Pennsylvania in the United States from the 11th of October to the 18th October. Mohamed El Shorbagy won his first US Open trophy, beating Amr Shabana in the final.

Prize money and ranking points
For 2014, the prize purse is $115,000. The on-site prize money and points breakdown was as follows:

Seeds

Draw and results

See also
United States Open (squash)
PSA World Series 2014
Women's United States Open (squash) 2014

References

External links
PSA US Open 2014 website
US Squash Open official website

Squash tournaments in the United States
Men's US Open
Men's US Open
Squ
Men's United States Open (squash) 2014
Men's United States Open (squash) 2014
Squash in Pennsylvania